Sriranga II (a.k.a. Sriranga Chika Raya) (r. 1614 CE) was nominated in 1614 by  King Venkata II to succeed him as king of the Vijayanagara Empire in Southern India. Sriranga was supported by a faction headed by Yachama Naidu of Recherla Velama dynasty, one of the Venkata II's loyal viceroys and commanders and Nayak of Venkatagiri, but was not favored by a set of nobles headed by Gobburi Jagga Raya, brother (or father) of Venkata II’s favourite Queen Obayamma.

Coup and Murder
The presence of a putative heir of former King Venkata II further worsened matters. Jagga Raya, with two of his lieutenants seized Sriranga II and his family and threw them into prison at Vellore Fort, and crowned the namesake son of the former emperor.

Yachama Naidu opposed the plans of Jagga Raya and, with the help of a washer man, smuggled Sriranga’s 12-year-old second son, Rama, from the fort. However, a subsequent attempt by Yachama Naidu to bring Sriranga II and his family through an underground escape tunnel was discovered, making Sriranga II’s confinement more severe.

Finally, Yachama Naidu arranged with the captain of the Vellore Fort to murder the guards and release Sriranga II and his family.  The guards were eventually killed, but the news reached Jagga Raya first, and he rushed in before Yachama Naidu could succeed and tasked his brother named Chinna Obo Raya to persuade Sriranga II and his family to either kill themselves or kill them himself if they refuse to do so. In pain, Sriranga II agreed to Chinna Obo Raya's words killing his family and finally himself.

Aftermath
Yachama attacked Chandragiri and captured the fort but the putative heir of Venkata II and few of his nobles managed to escape from the fort and joined the Jagga raya's camp. The murder of the Royal family created shock and horror throughout the kingdom, fomenting hatred of Jagga Raya and his group. As a result, when Yachama headed his forces towards the Vellore fort there was no one to oppose him and the fort was surrendered without any resistance. Many nobles and chieftains deserted the Jagga Raya faction and joined Yachama's camp, which backed a legal royal claimant.

Thus Sriranga II was killed within four months of his accession, but one of his sons, Ramadeva, escaped from the massacre to become the next King of Vijayanagara, after winning a gruesome war of succession (Battle of Toppur) in 1617.

References

 http://www.thiruvarangam.com/history.html
 Rao, Velcheru Narayana, and David Shulman, Sanjay Subrahmanyam. Symbols of substance : court and state in Nayaka period Tamilnadu (Delhi ; Oxford : Oxford University Press, 1998) ; xix, 349 p., [16] p. of plates : ill., maps ; 22 cm. ; Oxford India paperbacks ; Includes bibliographical references and index ; .
 Sathianathaier, R. History of the Nayaks of Madura [microform] by R. Sathyanatha Aiyar ; edited for the University, with introduction and notes by S. Krishnaswami Aiyangar ([Madras] : Oxford University Press, 1924) ; see also ([London] : H. Milford, Oxford university press, 1924) ; xvi, 403 p. ; 21 cm. ; SAMP early 20th-century Indian books project item 10819.
K.A. Nilakanta Sastry, History of South India, From Prehistoric times to fall of Vijayanagar, 1955, OUP, (Reprinted 2002) .

1614 deaths
17th-century Indian monarchs
People of the Vijayanagara Empire
Tamil Nadu under the Vijayanagar Empire
Telugu monarchs
Year of birth unknown
People from Vellore district